Salman Ali is an Indian singer who won the 10th season of Indian Idol. He was the first runner-up in the 2011 Sa Re Ga Ma Pa L'il Champs. In 2019, he made his debut as a playback singer with the song Jai He from the film Satellite Shankar. In 2019, he also sang the song Awara for the film Dabangg 3. Salman sang the theme song for the Indian television series Chandragupta Maurya, which airs on Sony TV.

Background 
Salman Ali was born in Punhana, a town in Haryana's Nuh district. Salman's family has made a living off of singing for the past four generations.

Television

Discography

References

Living people
Indian male singers
Indian Idol winners
People from Nuh district
Singers from Haryana
1998 births